The  is a 10.9 km mostly single-track branchline in Saitama Prefecture, Japan, operated by the private railway operator Tobu Railway. It runs from Sakado Station on the Tobu Tojo Line to Ogose Station, connecting with the JR East Hachikō Line.

Service outline
Service consists of four trains per hour in each direction during the daytime, increased to six trains per hour in the morning and evening peak periods. Services are formed of 4-car 8000 series electric multiple unit (EMU) trains.

Stations
All stations are located in Saitama Prefecture.

Closed stations
 , between Ippommatsu and Nishi-Ōya stations. Closed on 1 December 1945.

Rolling stock
Since June 2008, all Ogose Line services are formed of four-car 8000 series EMU trains. 7300 series EMUs were used up until 1984, 7800 series EMUs were used up until 1985, 5000 series EMUs were used until 1990, and 10030 series and 10050 series EMUs were also used alongside the 8000 series trains until the start of driver-only operation in June 2008.

History
The line was extended from Morido to Ogose on 16 December 1934, from which date passenger services also commenced.

From 1 July 1943, the Ogose Railway was absorbed into the Tobu Railway, and the line was renamed the Tobu Ogose Line. From 1 December 1944, all services on the line were suspended, as the line was considered non-essential as part of the war effort. Services were not resumed until 1 December 1945.

The line was electrified in July 1950 at 1,500 V DC. CTC signalling was commissioned on 1 October 1959, the first use of this system by the Tobu company. Freight services between Nishi-Oya and Ogose ceased on 21 February 1984, and between Sakado and Nishi-Oya on 1 August 1984. On 25 August 1987, the Bushu-Nagase to Higashi-Moro section was double-tracked.

Through trains to and from Ikebukuro and Kawagoeshi on the Tojo Line operated until the 1970s. This train initially ran non-stop from Ikebukuro to Ogose (with a driver change at Sakado), but, in subsequent years, included stops at Asakadai and Kawagoe. From 2004 until 2007, regular scheduled trains on the Ogose Line were decorated with an Ogose Kanbai headboard for one day during March.

The Ogose Line switched to driver-only operation from the start of the revised timetable on 14 June 2008. The start of driver-only operation also involved the installation of platform edge sensors at all stations on the Ogose Line.

From 17 March 2012, station numbering was introduced on all Tobu lines. Tobu Tojo Line and Ogose Line stations were numbered prefixed with the letters "TJ".

Former connecting lines

A freight-only line serving the Nippon Cement works in Hidaka operated from 1963 until 1984, using a spur track which branched off from the line at Nishi-Ōya Junction, to the east of Nishi-Ōya Station.

See also
 List of railway lines in Japan

References

External links

  

 
Ogose Line
Rail transport in Saitama Prefecture
1067 mm gauge railways in Japan
Railway lines opened in 1932
1932 establishments in Japan